KCFR-FM (90.1 MHz) is a radio station in Denver, Colorado, which is owned and operated by Colorado Public Radio and simulcast to several AM and FM stations throughout the state. The signals from some of these stations also extend into eastern Utah and southern Wyoming. Some of KCFR-FM's programming is heard on KPRE 89.9 FM in Vail, which also carries programming from classical music station KVOD, also located in Denver.

On July 9, 2008, CPR moved the KCFR-FM news-talk programming in Denver to 90.1 FM. The KVOD classical programming that was broadcast on that frequency moved to the newly acquired 88.1 FM signal.

Programming
KCFR-FM, KVOQ and KCFC broadcast programming from National Public Radio (including Morning Edition and All Things Considered), as well as an original daily interview show called Colorado Matters.

HD broadcasting
KCFR broadcasts in HD.

HD1 is a simulcast of the analog (traditional) signal, and

HD2 is a Classical music format.

History
KCFR ("Colorado Free Radio") was owned by the University of Denver, between 1970 and 1983, on 90.1 FM. In 1984, the station was transferred to a community board of directors which eventually formed Colorado Public Radio.  It has always been an NPR affiliate, having signed on as a charter member of the network.

In September 2000, CPR acquired the intellectual properties of then-AM classical station KVOD. In March 2001, KVOD replaced KCFR at 90.1 FM and KCFR was moved to 1340 AM. On July 9, 2008, KCFR-FM moved back to 90.1 FM, with KVOD moving to the newly acquired 88.1 FM frequency.

References

External links

FCC history cards for KCFR-FM
 KCFR 1970 First Broadcasts and studio/transmitter photos
 Beat Radio

CFR-FM
NPR member stations
Radio stations established in 1970
1970 establishments in Colorado
CFR-FM